Batrachedra astricta is a species of moth in the family Batrachedridae. It is endemic to New Zealand. It is found in the north of the North Island and also Opoho in Otago. This species is on the wing in December. B. astricta has been found in wetland habitat. It has been shown to be associated with the threatened plant Sporadanthus ferrugineus.

Taxonomy 
This species was described by Alfred Philpott in 1930. George Hudson discussed and illustrated this species in his 1939 book A supplement to the butterflies and moths of New Zealand.  The holotype specimen of this species was collected by Charles E. Clarke on 17 December 1921 at Opoho in Otago. The holotype specimen is held at the Auckland War Memorial Museum.

Description 

Philpott described B. astricta as follows: 
This species can be distinguished from its close relative B. tristicata as B. astricta lacks the round black apical spot found on the forewings of that species as well as lacking the elongated stigmata.

Distribution 

This species is endemic to New Zealand. Other than the type locality of Opoho, this species has also been collected in the northern part of the North Island.

Biology and behaviour 
This species is on the wing in December. This species has been shown to be associated with the threatened plant Sporadanthus ferrugineus. B. astricta has been found in wetland habitat.

References

Batrachedridae
Moths of New Zealand
Endemic fauna of New Zealand
Moths described in 1930
Taxa named by Alfred Philpott
Endemic moths of New Zealand